Edward Magruder "Tut" Tutwiler Jr. (September 13, 1880 – September 3, 1932) was a college football player and coach. He played quarterback for the Alabama Crimson Tide of the University of Alabama and the Virginia Cavaliers of the University of Virginia.

Early years
Edward M. Tutwiler, Jr was born on September 13, 1880 in Balcony Falls, Virginia to Maj. Edward Magruder Tutwiler, a wealthy Birmingham philanthropist, and Mary Fendley Jeffray. His father served in the American Civil War, participating in the Battle of New Market as one of the VMI cadets.

College

University of Alabama
Tutwiler was from Birmingham, Alabama at the time of his enrolling at the University of Alabama. He transferred from Alabama to Virginia. One account reads "Ed Tutwiler is one of the greatest stars that football in the south ever produced. He was a graduate of the University in the class of '98, and afterwards went to the University of Virginia. He was considered the pluckiest quarterback in the south, and was noted for head work and generalship."

University of Virginia

1901
Tutwiler was selected All-Southern in 1901. Fuzzy Woodruff gave Virginia the mythical southern championship regardless of conference affiliation for 1901.

Death
Tutwiler was found dead in pajamas in the bedroom of his Montgomery, Alabama home on September 3, 1932, with a wound in his right temple. A pistol lay near by; the family noted the apparent suicide had been preceded by a recent despondence because of ill health.

References

External links
 

1880 births
1932 suicides
American football quarterbacks
Alabama Crimson Tide football players
Centre Colonels football coaches
Virginia Cavaliers football players
All-Southern college football players
Players of American football from Birmingham, Alabama
Suicides by firearm in Alabama